Ilkka Tuomi (born 26 September 1958), is a Finnish computer scientist, noted for writings on the subject of the Internet.

Works
Ilkka Tuomi has written books, including Networks of Innovation: Change and Meaning in the Age of the Internet which develops theory of open innovation based on analysis of Internet-related innovations and open source, and Corporate Knowledge: Theory and Practice of Intelligent Organizations, which develops theory of knowledge management.

Tuomi has written several articles in First Monday, an important peer reviewed journal on the Internet. The most famous of Tuomi's articles is probably The Lives and Death of Moore's Law , in which Tuomi states that Moore's law is an expression of technological determinism, used sloppily, and to a large extent not properly founded in empirical studies. This article has an associated response from Ray Kurzweil at: Exponential Growth:-An Illusion (Response to Ilkka Tuomi) and a comment on the response at: Response to Kurzweil.

Career
Ilkka Tuomi was a staff member of the Institute for Prospective Technological Studies. He has also been a Principal Scientist at the Nokia Research Center. He is Chief Scientist at Oy Meaning Processing Ltd., an independent research institute located in Finland.

References
Ilkka Tuomi key papers at First Monday: 
 Ilkka Tuomi, The Lives and Death of Moore's Law, First Monday, volume 7, number 11 (November 2002)
 Ilkka Tuomi, Internet, Innovation, and Open Source: Actors in the Network, First Monday, volume 6, number 1 (January 2001)
 Ilkka Tuomi, Evolution of the Linux Credits File: Methodological Challenges and Reference Data for Open Source Research, First Monday, volume 9, number 6 (June 2004)
 Ilkka Tuomi, Economic Productivity in the Knowledge Society: A Critical Review of Productivity Theory and the Impacts of ICT, First Monday, volume 9, number 7 (July 2004)

Notes

External links
Further information about Ilkka Tuomi From the website of Oy Meaning Processing Ltd.

1958 births
Living people
Finnish computer scientists